The Electoral district of Stawell and Ararat was an electoral district of the Victorian Legislative Assembly. 
It was created from the Electoral district of Stawell and Electoral district of Ararat which were abolished in 1904.

Members

Election results

See also
 Parliaments of the Australian states and territories
 List of members of the Victorian Legislative Assembly

References

Former electoral districts of Victoria (Australia)
1904 establishments in Australia
1945 disestablishments in Australia